Ashani Fairclough (born August 7, 1992) is a Jamaican footballer.

Career

Early career
Fairclough captained his country’s team at Under-17 level in 2007 at the age of fifteen. A year later, he was recruited by various college scouts and chose to attend The University of South Florida. He is one of the youngest Jamaican athletes ever to go to college at just sixteen years old.

College and amateur
Fairclough played four years of college soccer at the University of South Florida between 2009 and 2012. While he was at college, Fairclough also appeared for USL PDL club VSI Tampa Flames during their 2012 season.

Professional
Fairclough wasn't drafted in the 2013 MLS SuperDraft, but signed with Major League Soccer's Seattle Sounders FC on March 22, 2013, after a strong pre-season on trial. However, he was waived by Seattle on June 27, 2013 without ever making a first-team appearance.

Fairclough signed with USL Pro club Wilmington Hammerheads on April 2, 2014. Fairclough was named to the USL Pro team of the week on May 6, 2014. At the end of 2014 USL PRO season, Fairclough was named to the USL PRO first team of the year.

International
Fairclough was a member of the 2009 Jamaica national U20 team.

Honors

Individual
USL Pro All-League First Team: 2014

References

External links

1992 births
Living people
Jamaican footballers
Jamaican expatriate footballers
South Florida Bulls men's soccer players
VSI Tampa Bay FC (PDL) players
Seattle Sounders FC players
Wilmington Hammerheads FC players
Tacoma Defiance players
Association football defenders
Expatriate soccer players in the United States
USL League Two players
USL Championship players
People from Saint Catherine Parish